Raimondas Vainoras (born 16 July 1965) is a Lithuanian football defender, who last played for Auda Riga in Latvia during his professional career. He obtained 44 caps for the Lithuania national football team, scoring no goals. Vainoras also played as a professional in Estonia and Russia.

Honours
National Team
 Baltic Cup
 1992

External links
 

1965 births
Living people
FK Žalgiris players
FK Atlantas players
FBK Kaunas footballers
FC Flora players
FK Sirijus Klaipėda players
FK Inkaras Kaunas players
FC Sokol Saratov players
Expatriate footballers in Estonia
Lithuanian expatriate sportspeople in Estonia
Soviet footballers
Lithuanian footballers
Lithuanian expatriate footballers
Lithuania international footballers
Association football defenders
Meistriliiga players